The 2023 Enugu State gubernatorial election will take place on 18 March 2023, to elect the Governor of Enugu State, concurrent with elections to the Enugu State House of Assembly as well as twenty-seven other gubernatorial elections and elections to all other state houses of assembly. The election—which was postponed from its original 11 March date—will be held three weeks after the presidential election and National Assembly elections. Incumbent PDP Governor Ifeanyi Ugwuanyi is term-limited and cannot seek re-election to a third term.

Party primaries were scheduled for between 4 April and 9 June 2022 with the Peoples Democratic Party nominating former commissioner Peter Mbah on 25 May while the All Progressives Congress nominated businessman Uche Nnaji unopposed on 26 May and the All Progressives Grand Alliance nominated former minister Frank Nweke on 29 May. On 4 August, Chijioke Edeoga—the runner-up in the PDP primary—won the primary of the Labour Party. The LP primary was annulled by a Federal High Court ruling on 9 November but a Court of Appeal judgment on 6 January 2023 overturned the High Court ruling, reinstating Edeoga as the legitimate LP nominee.

Electoral system
The Governor of Enugu State is elected using a modified two-round system. To be elected in the first round, a candidate must receive the plurality of the vote and over 25% of the vote in at least two-thirds of state local government areas. If no candidate passes this threshold, a second round will be held between the top candidate and the next candidate to have received a plurality of votes in the highest number of local government areas.

Background
Enugu State is a small, Igbo-majority southeastern state with a growing economy and natural resources but facing an underdeveloped agricultural sector, rising debt, and a low COVID-19 vaccination rate.

Politically, the state's 2019 elections were categorized as a continuation of the PDP's control as Ugwuanyi won with over 95% of the vote and the party won every seat in the House of Assembly along with all three senate seats and all eight House of Representatives seats. On the presidential level, the state was easily won by PDP presidential nominee Atiku Abubakar but it did swung towards Buhari compared to 2015 and had lower turnout.

During its second term, the Ugwuanyi administration's stated focuses included battling insecurity, completing infrastructure projects, and improving rural roads. In terms of his performance, Ugwuanyi was commended for taking some action to combat insecurity, expanding the rural road network, and properly deescalating November 2020 religious clashes in Nsukka while being criticized for failing to stop kidnappings and poor water management.

Primary elections
The primaries, along with any potential challenges to primary results, were to take place between 4 April and 3 June 2022 but the deadline was extended to 9 June. An informal zoning gentlemen's agreement sets the Enugu East Senatorial District to have the next governor as Enugu East has not held the governorship since 2007. While the APC zoned their nomination to the East, the PDP and APGA did not make a formal zoning decision; all three parties ultimately nominated an easterner.

All Progressives Congress 
In June 2021, Enugu APC Chairman Ben Nwoye announced that the party had zoned their nomination to Enugu East Senatorial District.

On the primary date, businessman Uche Nnaji was the sole candidate and won the nomination unopposed. In his acceptance speech, Nnaji vowed to bring prosperity to Enugu State as governor. However, a few days after the primary, there were reports that the APC was in discussions with longtime Senator and losing PDP gubernatorial candidate Ike Ekweremadu over substituting him in as the party nominee; the talks failed though and Nnaji remained nominee. In mid-August, Nnaji announced George Ogara as his running mate at the party’s Zonal Secretariat.

Nominated 
 Uche Nnaji: businessman
Running mate—George Ogara

Withdrew 
 Chris Agu: former civil servant
 Dave Nnamani: marketing manager

Declined 
 Ayogu Eze: 2019 APC gubernatorial nominee, former Senator for Enugu North (2007–2015), and 2015 APC gubernatorial candidate

Results

All Progressives Grand Alliance 

Pre-primary analysis gave the edge to former Minister of Information Frank Nweke due to Nweke's political experience and the low name recognition of his opponents. On the primary date, five candidates contested an indirect primary that ended with Nweke emerging as the APGA nominee after results showed Nweke winning just under 50% of the delegates' votes, defeating businessman Jeff Nnamani by just 6 votes. In mid-July, Nweke picked Edith Ugwuanyi—a businesswoman from Ibagwa-Aka in Igbo Eze South—as his running mate at a press briefing in Enugu.

Nominated 
 Frank Nweke: former Minister of Information and Communications (2005–2007), former Minister of Intergovernmental Affairs (2003–2005), and former Chief of Staff to the Governor (2001–2003)
Running mate—Edith Ugwuanyi: businesswoman

Eliminated in primary 
 Jeff Nnamani: businessman
 Uchenna Nwegbo
 Donatus Obi-Ozoemena: 2019 UDP gubernatorial nominee (defected after the primary to run in the ADC gubernatorial primary)
 Dons Udeh: former state PDP Secretary; former Commissioner for Works, Housing and Transport; and former Commissioner for Commerce and Industry

Results

People's Democratic Party 
A 2013 Enugu PDP internal party resolution that resurfaced in August 2021 enshrined zoning for the 2015 election and thus adding to the claims of the pro-zoning to Enugu East camp. Zoning became under threat due to the gubernatorial candidacy of longtime Senator Ike Ekweremadu, who is from Enugu West, as he and his allies denied that zoning was ever a factor in the state or claimed that it was no longer necessary; the controversy that surrounded Ekweremadu's campaign and disregard for zoning led to vast internal divisions within the party. Another cause of controversy was the alleged support that Ugwuanyi was giving to former commissioner Peter Mbah's candidacy despite Mbah's ongoing prosecution by the Economic and Financial Crimes Commission.

Ahead of the primary, analysts named four candidates as the most likely to win: former commissioner Chijioke Jonathan Edeoga, Ekweremadu, Mbah, and former minister Bartholomew Nnaji. The day before the primary, former Anambra State Governor Jim Nwobodo formally announced that Mbah was the preferred candidate of Ugwuanyi and other major Enugu State PDP figures. Prior to the primary on the next day, three candidates (including Ekweremadu) withdrew in protest of the perceived imposition by Ugwuanyi while eight more candidates dropped out at the primary venue, but instead they endorsed Mbah. When collation completed, Mbah won the nomination after announced results showed him winning over 97% of the delegates' votes. In mid-June, Ifeanyi Ossai—a barrister from Nsukka—was announced as his running mate at a joint press conference with Mbah in Enugu.

Nominated 
 Peter Mbah: former Commissioner for Finance and Economic Development and former Chief of Staff to the Governor
Running mate—Ifeanyi Ossai: barrister

Eliminated in primary 
 Gilbert Chukwunta
 Chijioke Jonathan Edeoga: former Commissioner for Environment (2019–2022), former Commissioner for Local Government Matters (2015–2019), former House of Representatives member for Enugu East/Isi-Uzo (1999–2003), and former Isi Uzo Local Government Chairman (defected after the primary to successfully run in the LP gubernatorial primary)
 Hilary Edeoga: former Commissioner for Agriculture and Natural Resources (2007–2009) and professor
 Bartholomew Nnaji: former Minister of Power (2011–2012) and former Minister of Science and Technology (1992–1993)
 Gilbert Nnaji: former Senator for Enugu East, former House of Representatives member for Enugu East/Isi-Uzo (2003–2011), and former Enugu East Local Government Chairman (1997–1998; 1999–2002)
 Chinyeaka Ohaa: former Federal Permanent Secretary

Withdrew 

 Gabriel Ajah: former Secretary to the State Government
 Beloved Dan Anike: former commissioner and RCCG pastor
 Erasmus Anike: engineer
 Ofor Chukwuegbo: House of Representatives member for Enugu North/Enugu South (2019–present) and former House of Assembly member (2003–2007)
 Ike Ekweremadu: Senator for Enugu West (2003–present), former Deputy President of the Nigerian Senate (2007–2019), former Secretary to the State Government (2001–2002), former Chief of Staff to the Governor (1999–2001), and former Aninri Local Government Chairman
 Evarest Nnaji: businessman
 Jehu Nnaji: professor
 Chukwudi Abraham Nneji: physician
 Ralph Nwoye: former Deputy Governor (2014–2015)
 Godwin Ogenyi: former Commissioner for Poverty Reduction and Human Development
 Josef-Ken Onoh: Chairman of the Enugu Capital Territory Development Authority (2019–present), former House of Assembly member (2003–2007), and son of former Anambra State Governor Christian Onoh
 Abraham Onyishi
 Kingsley Udeh: former aide to Ugwuanyi
 Nwabueze Ugwu: lawyer

Declined 
 Patrick Asadu: House of Representatives member for Nsukka/Igbo-Eze South (2011–present)
 Alex Obiechina: 2011 PDP gubernatorial candidate
 Edward Uchenna Ubosi: House of Assembly member for Enugu East Urban (2011–present) and Speaker of the House of Assembly (2015–present)

Results

Minor parties 

 Chukwunonso Daniel Ogbe (Action Alliance)
Running mate: Iyida Ikechukwu Onyedika
 Nnamdi Omeje (Action Democratic Party)
Running mate: Ifeoma Stella Ani
 Afamefuna Samuel Ani (Action Peoples Party)
Running mate: Anthony Adinifekwu Aduaka
 Ray Ogbodo (African Action Congress)
Running mate: Shedrack Ejiofor Itodo
 Donatus Ozoemena (African Democratic Congress)
Running mate: Celestina Anita Ugwanyi
 Kenneth Odoh Ikeh (Allied Peoples Movement)
Running mate: Chigozie Onovo
 Chijioke Jonathan Edeoga (Labour Party)
Running mate: John Nwokeabia
 Cajetan Eze (New Nigeria Peoples Party)
Running mate: Francis Ifesinachi Nwodo
 Cyril Elochukwu Mamah (National Rescue Movement)
Running mate: Helen Onuegbunam Okwor
 Christopher Ejike Agu (People's Redemption Party)
Running mate: Chidozie Anthony Oziko
 Pearl Ogochukwu Nweze (Social Democratic Party)
Running mate: Mark Anthony Eze
 Ugochukwu Edeh (Young Progressives Party)
Running mate: James Chidiebere Agbo
 Elvis Chinazam Ugwoke (Zenith Labour Party)
Running mate: Daniel Okwudili Mba

Campaign 
Like in most states, the months of June and July 2022 were dedicated to attempts at party reconciliation in the wake of the primaries. While the APC leadership crisis had never ended and APGA was never extremely divided, the PDP faced several internal divides based on personal and regional strife; both primary runner-up Chijioke Jonathan Edeoga and longtime Senator Ike Ekweremadu were rumored to be leaving the party after the primary as Ekweremadu first went to the APC before a new plan for an Ekweremadu-Edeoga ticket in the Labour Party was concocted since the minor party had grown due to Peter Obi's presidential campaign. However, the PDP was initially able to bring Ekweremadu and Edeoga back to the party with both releasing public statements accepting the primary results; but dynamics then shifted when Ekweremadu was arrested and detained in the United Kingdom for an organ-harvesting conspiracy while Edeoga ended up joining the Labour Party to become its nominee.

As the campaign continued into August 2022, analysts noted the competing region-based claims for the right to contest the election along with the added factor of Ugwuanyi's senatorial candidacy for the Enugu North district. The next month, reporting on the continued state APC internal crisis revealed such extreme infighting that it pundits argued the rival blocs focused more on internal power than electoral performance. Nnaji even rejected campaign contributions from APC presidential nominee Bola Tinubu and claimed that disputes over those incoming funds were a driver of the internal crisis. By September, multiple reports had classified Edeoga as a major candidate due to the Labour Party's growth and reported anger towards the long-governing state PDP (especially in the region around Nsukka). However, in November, Edeoga's nomination was nullified by a court ruling; the LP initiated an appeal instead of holding a new primary and the nullification was overturned by an Appeal Court ruling in early January.

By February, attention mainly switched to the presidential election on 25 February. In the election, Enugu State voted for Peter Obi (LP); Obi won the state with 93.9% of the vote, beating Atiku Abubakar (PDP) at 3.5% and Bola Tinubu (APC) at 1.1%. Although the result was unsurprising—Enugu is in Obi's southeastern stronghold and projections had favored him—the result led to increased attention on the chances of both Edeoga and Nweke, especially considering the overall decline of the state PDP. Although Edeoga was the LP nominee and received Obi's endorsement, some elements of LP supporters balked at Edeoga's former association with Ugwuanyi in addition to his unpopular time as Environment Commissioner and instead backed Nweke. Based on these dynamics, the EiE-SBM forecast projected Nweke to win. On the other hand, a Premium Times article labeled the election as a "two-horse race" between Edeoga and Mbah.

Projections

Conduct

Electoral timetable

General election

Results

By senatorial district 
The results of the election by senatorial district.

By federal constituency
The results of the election by federal constituency.

By local government area 
The results of the election by local government area.

See also 
 2023 Nigerian elections
 2023 Nigerian gubernatorial elections

Notes

References 

Enugu State gubernatorial election
2023
2023 Enugu State elections
Enugu